Classical pluralism is the view that politics and decision-making are located mostly in the framework of government, but that many non-governmental groups use their resources to exert influence. The central question for classical pluralism is how power and influence are distributed in a political process. Groups of individuals try to maximize their interests. Lines of conflict are multiple and shifting as power is a continuous bargaining process between competing groups. There may be inequalities but they tend to be distributed and evened out by the various forms and distributions of resources throughout a population. Any change under this view will be slow and incremental, as groups have different interests and may act as "veto groups" to destroy legislation. The existence of diverse and competing interests is the basis for a democratic equilibrium, and is crucial for the obtaining of goals by individuals. A polyarchy—a situation of open competition for electoral support within a significant part of the adult population—ensures competition of group interests and relative equality. Pluralists stress civil rights, such as freedom of expression and organization, and an electoral system with at least two parties. On the other hand, since the participants in this process constitute only a tiny fraction of the populace, the public acts mainly as bystanders. This is not necessarily undesirable for two reasons: (1) it may be representative of a population content with the political happenings, or (2) political issues require continuous and expert attention, which the average citizen may not have.

Important theorists of pluralism include Robert A. Dahl (who wrote the seminal pluralist work, Who Governs?), David Truman, and Seymour Martin Lipset.

Pluralist conception of power
The list of possible sources of power is virtually endless: legal authority, money, prestige, skill, knowledge, charisma, legitimacy, free time, and experience. Pluralists also stress the differences between potential and actual power as it stands. Actual power means the ability to compel someone to do something and is the view of power as a causation. Dahl describes power as a "realistic relationship, such as A's capacity for acting in such a manner as to control B's responses".

Potential power refers to the possibility of turning resources into actual power. Cash, one of many resources, is only a stack of bills until it is put to work. Malcolm X, for example, was certainly not a rich person growing up, but received money from many groups after his prison term and used other resources such as his forceful personality and organizational skills.  He had a greater impact on American politics than most wealthy people. A particular resource like money cannot automatically be equated with power because the resource can be used skillfully or clumsily, fully or partially, or not at all. 

Pluralists believe that social heterogeneity prevents any single group from gaining dominance. In their view, politics is essentially a matter of aggregating preferences. This means that coalitions are inherently unstable (Polsby, 1980), hence competition is easily preserved. In Dahl's view, because "political heterogeneity follows socioeconomic heterogeneity", social differentiation increasingly disperses power. In this case, Hamed Kazemzadeh (Canadian Pluralist and Human rights activist) argues that organizational membership socializes individuals to democratic norms, increases participation and moderates the politics of society so that bargaining and negotiation are possible.  
The pluralist approach to the study of power, states that nothing categorical about power can be assumed in any community. The question then is not who runs a community, but if any group in fact does.  To determine this, pluralists study specific outcomes.  The reason for this is that they believe human behavior is governed in large part by inertia.  That said, actual involvement in overt activity is a more valid marker of leadership than simply a reputation.  Pluralists also believe that there is no one particular issue or point in time at which any group must assert itself to stay true to its own expressed values, but rather that there are a variety of issues and points at which this is possible.  There are also costs involved in taking action at all not only losing, but the expenditure of time and effort. While a structuralist may argue that power distributions have a rather permanent nature, this rationale says that power may in fact be tied to issues, which vary widely in duration. Also, instead of focusing on actors within a system, the emphasis is on the leadership roles itself.  By studying these, it can be determined to what extent there is a power structure present in a society.

Three of the major tenets of the pluralist school are (1) resources and hence potential power are widely scattered throughout society; (2) at least some resources are available to nearly everyone; and (3) at any time the amount of potential power exceeds the amount of actual power.

Finally, and perhaps most important, no one is all-powerful unless proven so through empirical observation. An individual or group that is influential in one realm may be weak in another. Large military contractors certainly throw their weight around on defense matters, but how much sway do they have on agricultural or health policies? A measure of power, therefore, is its scope, or the range of areas where it is successfully applied as observed by a researcher. Pluralists believe that with few exceptions power holders usually have a relatively limited scope of influence.  Pluralism does leave room for an elitist situation-  Should group A continuously exert power over multiple groups.  For a pluralist to accept this notion, it must be empirically observed and not assumed so by definition.

For all these reasons power cannot be taken for granted. One has to observe it empirically in order to know who really governs. The best way to do this, pluralists believe, is to examine a wide range of specific decisions, noting who took which side and who ultimately won and lost. Only by keeping score on a variety of controversies can one begin to identify actual power holders. Pluralism was associated with behavioralism.

A contradiction to pluralist power is often cited from the origin of one's power.  Although certain groups may share power, people within those groups set agendas, decide issues, and take on leadership roles through their own qualities. Some theorists argue that these qualities cannot be transferred, thus creating a system where elitism still exists.  What this theory fails to take into account is the prospect of overcoming these qualities by garnering support from other groups.  By aggregating power with other organizations, interest groups can over-power these non-transferable qualities.  In this sense, political pluralism still applies to these aspects.

Elite pluralism
Elite pluralists agree with classical pluralists that there is "plurality" of power; however, this plurality is not "pure" as some people and groups have more power than others. For example, some people have more money than others, so they can pay to have their opinion put across better (i.e. more advertising) than the working class can. This inequality is because society has "elites"; people who have more power, perhaps through money, inheritance or social tradition than others.

Basically, it claims that elites play a big role in decision making. The idea behind reads as follows: in democracies, the people participate in electing the elites who will represent them and, at the end, the ones who are going to make the laws. As Davita S. Glasberg and Deric Shannon highlights, "political elites are not a monoholitic, unified interest group representing their own narrow group of interests but rather are diverse, competitive elites representing a wide range of interests". They have to compete in "the political market place" in order to gain voters being the power equally distributed between all the potential voters. Moreover, the stability in the system is achieved through this competition among the elites, as they have to negotiate in order to pass a bill. And, sometimes, they have to change their positions and points of view in order to reach a common point. Elites respect and follow the policy-making procedures because they are accountable of their acts and they can be replaced through legal procedures of through new elections.

Neo-pluralism
While Pluralism as a political theory of the state and policy formation gained its most traction during the 1950s and 1960s in America, some scholars argued that the theory was too simplistic (see Connolly (1969) The Challenge to Pluralist Theory) leading to the formulation of neo-pluralism. Views differed about the division of power in democratic society. Although neo-pluralism sees multiple pressure groups competing over political influence, the political agenda is biased towards corporate power.  Neo-pluralism no longer sees the state as an umpire mediating and adjudicating between the demands of different interest groups, but as a relatively autonomous actor (with different departments) that forges and looks after its own (sectional) interests. Constitutional rules, which in pluralism are embedded in a supportive political culture, should be seen in the context of a diverse, and not necessarily supportive, political culture and a system of radically uneven economic sources. This diverse culture exists because of an uneven distribution of socioeconomic power. This creates possibilities for some groups while limiting others in their political options.
In the international realm, order is distorted by powerful multinational interests and dominant states, while in classical pluralism emphasis is put on stability by a framework of pluralist rules and free market society.

Charles Lindblom
Charles E. Lindblom, who is seen as positing a strong neo-pluralist argument, still attributed primacy to the competition between interest groups in the policy process but recognized the disproportionate influence business interests have in the policy process.

Corporatism
Classical pluralism was criticized as it did not seem to apply to Westminster-style democracies or the European context. This led to the development of corporatist theories. Corporatism is the idea that a few select interest groups are actually (often formally) involved in the policy formulation process, to the exclusion of the myriad other 'interest groups'. For example, trade unions and major sectoral business associations are often consulted about (if not the drivers of) specific policies.

These policies often concern tripartite relations between workers, employers and the state, with a coordinating role for the latter. The state constructs a framework in which it can address the political and economic issues with these organized and centralized groups. In this view, parliament and party politics lose influence in the policy forming process.

In foreign policy 

From the political aspect, 'pluralism' has a huge effect on the process and decision-making in formulating policy. In international security, during the policymaking process, different parties may have a chance to take part in decision making. The one who has more power, the more opportunity that it gains and the higher possibility to get what it wants. According to M. Frances (1991), "decision making appears to be a maze of influence and power."

See also
Agonism
Decision-making
Distributism
Foreign policy
Elite theory
International relations
Legitimation crisis
Marxism
New institutionalism
Salad bowl (cultural idea)

Notes

References
 Ankerl Guy(2000) Coexisting Contemporary Civilizations. Geneva: INUPress. 
 Socialstudieshelp.com, Pluralism. Accessed 13 February 2007.
 Elmer Eric Schattschneider (1960) The Semi-Sovereign People. New York: Holt, Rinehart and Winston.
 Gad Barzilai (2003) Communities and Law: Politics and Cultures of Legal Identities. Ann Arbor: University of Michigan Press.
 Polsby, Nelson W.  (1960) How to Study Community Power: The Pluralist Alternative. The Journal of Politics, (22)3, 474-484
 William E. Connolly: The Ethos of Pluralization. University of Minnesota Press, 1995.
 C. Alden (2011). Foreign policy analysis. London: University of London.
 H. Kazemzadeh (2020). Democratic platform in Social Pluralism. Internal Journal of ACPCS, Winter No.10 pp. 237-253.
 M. Frances Klein (1991). The Politics of Curriculum Decision-Making: Issues in Centralizing the Curriculum. New York: SUNY Press.

Comparative politics
Political science theories
Pluralism (philosophy)
Power sharing

az:Siyasi plüralizm
ca:Pluralisme polític
cs:Pluralismus (politická teorie)
cy:Lluosogaeth wleidyddol
de:Pluralismus (Politik)
fr:Pluralisme
hr:Pluralizam (politika)
lt:Pliuralizmas (tarptautiniai santykiai)
ja:多元論
pt:Pluralismo (política)
ru:Политический плюрализм
simple:Pluralism
sh:Pluralizam
fi:Pluralismi (yhteiskuntatieteet)